Little Nymboida River, a perennial stream of the Clarence River catchment, is located in the Northern Rivers and Northern Tablelands districts of New South Wales, Australia. It flows through the village of Lowanna.

Course and features
Little Nymboida River rises on the western slopes of Bushmans Range, on the slopes of the Great Dividing Range, east of Ulong, near Lowanna. The river flows in a meandering course generally north then southwest then northwest, joined by two tributaries including the Bobo River, before reaching its confluence with the Nymboida River, west of Black Mountain, within the Nymboida National Park. The river descends  over its  course.

See also

 Rivers of New South Wales

References

 

Rivers of New South Wales
Northern Rivers
Northern Tablelands